Men of Porn, sometimes typeset as Porn (The Men Of) and now simply known as Porn, is an American, San Francisco-based stoner rock band. They toured with Melvins on their "Double-Drumming Rock for Peace" tour at the end of 2006, and later played a set of dates during 2008 while opening for them on the 2008 Dog Tour.

Members
Tim Moss
Dale Crover
Billy Anderson

Discography
1999: Porn American Style
2001: Experiments In Feedback
2004: Wine, Women And Song
2008: ...And The Devil Makes Three (Collaboration with Merzbow)

Compilations
2000: Right In The Nuts: A Tribute to Aerosmith Small Stone Records
2002: Sucking the 70s Small Stone Records

References

External links
 The Men of Porn Web Site

American stoner rock musical groups
Heavy metal musical groups from California
Musical quartets
Man's Ruin Records artists